James Edward Thomas (born October 19, 1960) is a retired American professional basketball player. He was a 6'3",  shooting guard.

High school
Thomas played competitively at Nova High School, in Davie, Florida.

College career
Thomas played college basketball at Indiana University, from 1979–1983.  While playing for head coach Bobby Knight at Indiana, he was the sixth man on the 1981 national championship team, and also made the 1981 Final Four All Tournament Team, after grabbing nine rebounds off the bench, in place of foul-plagued starter Ted Kitchel, in the 63–50 title game win over North Carolina.

Professional career
Thomas played professionally in the NBA, with the Indiana Pacers, L.A. Clippers, and Minnesota Timberwolves, from 1983–1990.

He also played with several teams in the CBA including the Omaha Racers when they won the 1993 CBA Championship.

National team career
Thomas played with the US national team at the 1982 FIBA World Championship, winning the silver medal.

Coaching career
Thomas has worked as an assistant coach or scout for several NBA teams. In 2013, he joined the Atlanta Hawks' coaching staff.

References

External links
 
 Jim Thomas draft profile @ thedraftreview.com

1960 births
Living people
African-American basketball players
American expatriate basketball people in Argentina
American expatriate basketball people in Canada
American expatriate basketball people in Spain
American men's basketball players
Atlanta Hawks assistant coaches
Basketball coaches from Florida
Basketball players from Florida
CB Murcia players
Continental Basketball Association coaches
Ferro Carril Oeste basketball players
Indiana Hoosiers men's basketball coaches
Indiana Hoosiers men's basketball players
Indiana Pacers draft picks
Indiana Pacers players
Kansas City Sizzlers players
Liga ACB players
Los Angeles Clippers players
Minnesota Timberwolves players
Nova High School alumni
Omaha Racers players
Rapid City Thrillers players
Shooting guards
Sportspeople from Lakeland, Florida
Toronto Raptors assistant coaches
United States men's national basketball team players
21st-century African-American people
20th-century African-American sportspeople
1982 FIBA World Championship players